The men's 3000 metres event  at the 1997 IAAF World Indoor Championships was held on March 7–9.

Medalists

Results

Heats
First 4 of each heat (Q) and next 4 fastest (q) qualified for the final.

Final

References

3000
3000 metres at the World Athletics Indoor Championships